Active cables are copper cables for data transmission that use an electronic circuit to boost the performance of the cable. Without an electronic circuit, a cable is considered a passive cable. Passive cables are liable to degrade the data they carry, due to channel impairments, including attenuation, crosstalk and group velocity distortion. In active cables, a circuit using one or several integrated circuits is embedded in the cable to compensate for some or all of these impairments. This active boosting allows cables to be more compact, thinner, longer and transmit data faster than their passive equivalents.

Active cables are used in enterprise networks which form the backbone of modern data communication systems, and also to interconnect consumer devices such as cameras, gaming consoles, and HDTVs.

Embedding circuitry in cables can allow for less copper to be used in cable production for the same performance, reducing the weight of the cable by as much as 80%, and reduce cable size. Other benefits include longer reach and lower power consumption.

Consumer electronics
Active cables are more compact and portable than passive cables, and as such, they are ideal for use with products such as smartphones, HDTVs, gaming consoles, and DV cameras. DisplayPort is the latest consumer electronics standard that has enabled support for active cables by allocating power supply pins inside the connector. Active DisplayPort cables enable ultra-thin (32 AWG and thinner) and long-reach interconnects which are particularly valuable for the use with the miniature Mini DisplayPort form-factor.

Enterprise and storage applications
Active cables play an important role in enterprise and storage applications due to the confined space and air-flow requirements in data centers and long reaches (up to 30 meters) required to make some of the rack-to-rack connections. Because active cables can facilitate thin cable gauges, a tighter bend radius results, which can give cables in these applications easier maneuverability and improved airflow. 

Active cable adoption in data centers has been growing steadily. For example, as of 2010, half of SFP+ interconnect volume is in active cables (as opposed to passive copper cables and optical transceiver modules). The advent of QSFP (Quad SFP) interconnects for 40 Gigabit Ethernet and InfiniBand is driving the widespread adoption of active cables in this form-factor as well.

Standards
 InfiniBand
 Serial Attached SCSI (SAS)
 DisplayPort
 PCI Express
 HDMI
 USB
 Thunderbolt

Criticism
Opponents of active cable technology often criticize the fact that the electronics in an active cable design could be placed inside the connected devices instead, and an inexpensive passive cable used to connect the devices. Digital alternatives to using analog equalizers and impedance matching circuits to improve cable performance also exist, such as channel estimation or link adaptation.

Another criticism of active cables is that manufacturers may patent the electronics inside an active cable or even utilize on-chip cryptography to prevent competitors or consumers from producing their own replacement cables, and therefore enable manufacturers to monopolize the market for cables and charge consumers exorbitant prices. Active cables typically cost 5 to 10 times more than their passive counterparts. Some active cables are only produced by a single manufacturer, and sold through a single distributor. Low cable cost and high availability is desirable because cables are often inadvertently lost or damaged.

Some opponents of active cables also believe that active cables do not provide power savings for signal processing reasons, because in an active cable design, there is at least one extra integrated circuit (IC) compared to passive cable designs. This extra IC must be powered separately, when in a passive cable design, the signal processing can be integrated onto a single chip.

See also 

 10 Gigabit Ethernet
 100 Gigabit Ethernet
 C form-factor pluggable
 Cloud computing
 CXP (connector)
 Data center
 Fiber-optic communication
 Fibre Channel
 Green computing
 HDMI
 High-performance computing
 Interconnect bottleneck
 List of device bandwidths
 Optical cable
 Optical communication
 Optical link
 Optoelectronics
 Parallel optical interface
 PCI Express
 Small form-factor pluggable transceiver
 Terabit Ethernet
 Thunderbolt

References

Signal cables